GRASP was a systems software package that provided spooling facilities for the IBM/370 running DOS/VS or DOS/VSE environment, and IBM/360 running DOS or retrofitted with modified DOS.

The product 
GRASP was a mainframe operating system enhancement available for DOS, DOS/VS, DOS/VSE, and some third party DOS-based operating systems. Subsequent versions became known as GRASP/VS and GRASP/VSE.

It "spooled" (queued) printer and card data, freeing programs from being dependent upon the speed of printers or punched card equipment.

GRASP was the first such spooler for IBM mainframes, and later had competition from IBM's POWER and DataCorp's The Spooler. GRASP, like Spooler, could reside in an independent "F0" partition.

Platforms

Software
The product ran under several DOS-related platforms:
 DOS/VS
 DOS/VSE
 DOS
 DOS clones, 3rd party or modified

Hardware
Hardware platforms included:
 IBM/360 which ran Power
 IBM/370 which ran Power/VS
and clones, which included:
 Amdahl
 Fujitsu
 Hitachi
 Magnuson
 RCA

F0 
GRASP required a dedicated partition. With DOS having only three partitions and DOS/VS seven, giving up a partition to GRASP placed a crimp in practicability. The concept of F0 offered computers the availability of running the product without giving up a DOS partition. For DOS/VS and DOS/VSE versions, SDI re-engineered a version of Fx developed for DOCS and The Spooler.

History 
GRASP was originally developed in Australia by Boyd Munro. Assisted by Peter Hargrave, Munro formed Software Design, Inc (known as SDI) and began selling first in Australia, then Britain, and shortly thereafter the United States, through SDI, Inc, a California corporation. The marketing manager and chief salesman was Gerry Novotny.

SDI was one of the earliest and most aggressive software marketing companies.

References

External links
 SDI, Inc

Computer printing
IBM mainframe software